Vintarji is a small settlement in the hills west of Sveti Gregor in the Municipality of Ribnica in southern Slovenia. The entire municipality lies in the traditional region of Lower Carniola and is now included in the Southeast Slovenia Statistical Region.

Name
Vintarji was attested in historical sources as Wintter in 1436. The name Vintarji is a collective toponym, referring to a settlement where several people with the surname Vintar lived.

References

External links
Vintarji on Geopedia

Populated places in the Municipality of Ribnica